Knives of the Avenger is 1966 Italian film directed by Mario Bava. Bava entered production when it was already falling apart and re-wrote and shot the film in six days.  It was credited to fictitious director John Hold.

Production
Knives of the Avenger was a troubled production originally directed by Leopoldo Savona. Mario Bava entered into the production to complete it, rewriting and reshooting the film and finishing the production in six days. Film historian Tim Lucas described Knives of the Avenger as a remake of the film Shane in a Viking setting.

The film was shot at Titanus Studios in Rome.

Release
The Knives of the Avenger was released theatrically in Italy on 30 May 1966. It received a theatrical release in the United States in January 1968. Knives of the Avenger was released on DVD by Image Entertainment on 26 June 2001.

Reception
"Byro." of Variety declared the film "a real surprise: a beautifully designed and exciting Viking tale from pseudonymous Mario Bava. Only subject and cast make this a programmer - but it's a top one."

See also 
 List of Italian films of 1966

References

Footnotes

Sources

External links
 

1966 films
Italian adventure films
1966 adventure films
Films directed by Mario Bava
Films set in the Viking Age
1960s Italian films